Sefton Metropolitan Borough Council elections are generally held three years out of every four, with a third of the council being elected each time. Sefton Metropolitan Borough Council, generally known as Sefton Council, is the local authority for the metropolitan borough of Sefton in Merseyside, England. Since the last boundary changes in 2004, 66 councillors have been elected from 22 wards.

Political control
Sefton was created under the Local Government Act 1972 as a metropolitan borough, with Merseyside County Council providing county-level services. The first election to the council was held in 1973, initially operating as a shadow authority before coming into its powers on 1 April 1974. Merseyside County Council was abolished in 1986 and Sefton became a unitary authority. Political control of the council since 1973 has been held by the following parties:

Leadership
The leaders of the council since 1973 have been:

Council elections
 

‡ Liberal Party before 1988.

By-election results

1997-2001

2001-2005

2005-2009

2009-2013

2013-Present

References

By-election results

External links
Sefton Metropolitan Borough Council

 
Metropolitan Borough of Sefton
Politics of the Metropolitan Borough of Sefton
Council elections in Merseyside